Correbia flavata is a moth of the subfamily Arctiinae. It was described by Herbert Druce in 1909. It is found in Colombia.

References

Euchromiina
Moths described in 1909